Jean van de Velde (born 14 March 1957) is a Dutch film director and screenwriter. He has directed twelve films since 1979. His film The Silent Army competed in the Un Certain Regard section at the 2009 Cannes Film Festival. He is the father of actor Yannick van de Velde.

Selected filmography
 The Little Blonde Death (1993)
 De Flat (writer, 1994)
 All Stars (1997)
 Leak (2000)
 Floris (2004)
 Wild Romance (2006)
 The Silent Army (Original title: Wit Licht) (2008)
 All Stars 2: Old Stars (2011)
 The Price of Sugar (2013)
 Bram Fischer (2017)

References

External links
 
 
 

1957 births
Living people
People from Bukavu
Dutch film directors
Dutch male screenwriters
Dutch screenwriters
Golden Calf winners